The National Council for Democracy and Development (CNDD) was the ruling junta of Guinea from 2008 to 2010.

Historical background

The CNDD seized power in the 2008 Guinean coup d'état on 23 December 2008. This followed the death of the previous long-serving President, Lansana Conté.

Government 

On 5 May 2009 the government recalled thirty of the country's overseas ambassadors - about three quarters of the nation's total. No reason was given for the decision.

Members 

On 23 December, the CNDD announced that the Council's members were:

 Captain Moussa Dadis Camara - previously head of the army's fuel supplies unit 
 Brigadier General Mamadouba Camara
 Lt-Col Sékouba Konaté - previously head of an elite army unit 
 Lt-Col Mathurin Bangoura
 Lt-Col Aboubacar Sidiki Camara
 Commandant Oumar Baldé
 Commandant Mamadi Mara
 Commandant Almamy Camara
 Lieutenant Mamadou Bhoye Diallo
 Captain Kolako Béavogui
 Lt-Col Kandia Mara
 Colonel Sékou Mara
 Morciré Camara
 Alpha Yaya Diallo
 Lt-Col Mamadou Korka Diallo
 Captain Kéléti Faro
 Lieutenant Colonel Fodéba Touré
 Commandant Cheick Tidiane Camara
 Colonel Sékou Sako
 Sub-Lieutenant Claude Pivi
 Lieutenant Saa Alphonse Touré
 Moussa Kéïta
 Aédor Bah
 Commandant Bamou Lama
 Mohamed Lamine Kaba
 Captain Daman Condé
 Commandant Amadou Doumbouya
 Lieutenant Moussa Kékoro Camara
 Chief Adjutant Issa Camara
 Lt-Col Abdoulaye Chérif Diaby
 Dr Diakité Aboubacar Chérif
 Mamadi Condé
 Sub-Lieutenant Cheick Ahmed Touré

See also 

 Moussa Dadis Camara#December 2008 army intervention
 Lansana Conté#Death
 Politics of Guinea

References 

2008 establishments in Guinea
2010 disestablishments in Guinea
Politics of Guinea
Political organisations based in Guinea
Military dictatorships